Roger James Goodman (born 26 May 1960) is a British social scientist and academic, specialising in Japanese studies. He is the Nissan Professor of Modern Japanese Studies at the Nissan Institute for Japanese Studies at the University of Oxford, and the sixth Warden of St Antony's College, Oxford.

Goodman became president of the Academy of Social Sciences in January 2020. He was also head of the Social Sciences Division of Oxford from 2008 to 2017.

Early life and education
Goodman was born on 26 May 1960 to Cyril Joshua Goodman and Ruth Goodman (née Sabel). He was educated at Rugby School, a then all-boys private boarding school, and at King Edward VI Grammar School, Chelmsford, then an all-boys state grammar school. He studied at the Durham University, graduating with a Bachelor of Arts (BA) degree in 1981. In 1982, he matriculated into St Antony's College, Oxford, to undertake postgraduate studies in social anthropology. He completed his Doctor of Philosophy (DPhil) degree in 1987 with a thesis titled "A study of the Kikokushijo phenomenon: returnee schoolchildren in contemporary Japan".

Academic career
In August 2016, Goodman was announced as the next Warden of St Antony's College, Oxford. He became sixth Warden in October 2017 in succession to the retiring Margaret MacMillan.

Selected works

References 

 

 
 
 

British Japanologists
Living people
Alumni of St Antony's College, Oxford
Wardens of St Antony's College, Oxford
British social scientists
1960 births
People educated at Rugby School
People educated at King Edward VI Grammar School, Chelmsford
Alumni of University College, Durham